La Plume was a French bi-monthly literary and artistic review. The magazine was set up in 1889 by Léon Deschamps, who edited it for ten years and was succeeded as editor by Karl Boès from 1899 to 1914. Its offices were at number 31 rue Bonaparte, Paris. From its beginning, famous artists such as Willette, Forain, Eugène Grasset, Toulouse-Lautrec, Maurice Denis, Mucha, Gauguin, Pissarro, Félicien Rops, Signac, Seurat, and Redon contributed to it. One of its most famous issues is that devoted to Le Chat noir. The magazine supported the  symbolist art movement.

From 1903, La Plume sponsored weekly poetry events which included famous poets such as Max Jacob and Alfred Jarry. The magazine folded in 1914.

References

1889 establishments in France
1914 disestablishments in France
Bi-monthly magazines published in France
Defunct literary magazines published in France
French-language magazines
Magazines established in 1889
Magazines disestablished in 1914
Magazines published in Paris